Wilfrid Hyde-White (12 May 1903 – 6 May 1991) was a British character actor of stage, film and television. He achieved international recognition for his role as Colonel Pickering in the film version of the musical My Fair Lady (1964).

Early life and career
Wilfrid Hyde White was born in Bourton-on-the-Water in Gloucestershire, England in 1903 to the Rev. William Edward White, canon of Gloucester Cathedral, and his wife, Ethel Adelaide ( Drought). He was the nephew of actor J. Fisher White. He attended Marlborough College and the Royal Academy of Dramatic Art, of which he said, "I learned two things at RADA - I can't act and it doesn't matter."

He made his stage debut in the farcical play Tons of Money on the Isle of Wight in 1922 and appeared in the West End for the first time three years later in the play Beggar on Horseback. He then gained steady work on the stage in a series of comedies produced at the Aldwych Theatre in London. He joined a tour of South Africa in 1932 before making his film debut in Josser on the Farm (1934) where he was credited as "Wilfrid Hyde White" (without the hyphen). He also appeared in some earlier films as plain "Hyde White". He later added the hyphen, as well as his first name.

Following a supporting role in The Third Man (1949), he became a fixture in British films of the 1950s. His other films of this period include Carry on Nurse (1959) and the Danny Kaye film On the Double (1961). Two-Way Stretch (1960) displays a more roguish side than some of the characters he played in this period. He continued to act on the stage and played opposite Laurence Olivier and Vivien Leigh in the repertory performance of Caesar and Cleopatra and Antony and Cleopatra in 1951. He also appeared on Broadway and was nominated for a Tony Award in 1956 for his role in The Reluctant Debutante. His first Hollywood appearance came alongside Marilyn Monroe in the film Let's Make Love (1960), followed by other films, including My Fair Lady (1964).

Later career
Between 1962 and 1965, Hyde-White starred in the BBC radio comedy The Men from the Ministry. In the 1970s and 1980s, he featured on the Battlestar Galactica pilot episode "Saga of a Star World" and The Associates. He was a series regular on the revamped second season of Buck Rogers in the 25th Century playing one of the crew of the Starships Searchers primary characters Doctor Goodfellow. He continued to appear on Broadway, and earned a second Tony nomination for his performance in The Jockey Club Stakes.

He appeared in two episodes of the mystery series Columbo, starring Peter Falk as the rumpled detective. Although the first, "Dagger of the Mind" (1972), was set in Britain and concerned Columbo paying a visit to Scotland Yard, Hyde-White's ongoing UK tax problems meant that, unlike American actors Falk and Richard Basehart, and British actors appearing in the episode, Honor Blackman, Bernard Fox, John Fraser and Arthur Malet, he was unable to take part in location filming in the UK. His scenes as a butler were therefore filmed in California. His second appearance on Columbo was in the episode "Last Salute to the Commodore" in 1976.

He was the subject of This Is Your Life in 1976 when he was surprised by Eamonn Andrews at Goodwood Racecourse.

Personal life
On 17 December 1927, he married Blanche Hope Aitken, a Glamorgan-born British actress known professionally as Blanche Glynne (1893–1946), who was a decade his senior. The couple had one son. Blanche Glynne died in 1946, aged 53, and in 1957 Hyde-White married actress Ethel Drew. He and Drew remained married until his death in 1991. The couple had two children, including actor Alex Hyde-White.

Hyde-White had a reputation as a bon viveur, and in 1979 he was declared bankrupt by the Inland Revenue.

Death
Hyde-White died from heart failure on 6 May 1991, six days before his 88th birthday, at the Motion Picture Country Home in Woodland Hills, Los Angeles, California, having lived in the United States for 25 years as a tax exile. His body was returned to the United Kingdom and buried in the family grave at The Cemetery, Bourton-on-the-Water, Gloucestershire.

Filmography

Complete films

 Josser on the Farm (1934) as Brooks
 Smith's Wives (1935) (uncredited)
 Night Mail (1935) (uncredited)
 Admirals All (1935) as Mr. Stallybrass
 Murder by Rope (1936) as Alastair Dane
 Rembrandt (1936) as Civil Guardsman (uncredited)
 The Scarab Murder Case (1936) as Philo Vance
 Spring Handicap (1937) as Hawkins (uncredited)
 Elephant Boy (1937) as Commissioner
 Bulldog Drummond at Bay (1937) as Conrad (uncredited)
 Change for a Sovereign (1937) as Charles
 Murder in the Family (1938) as Purvitt - Estate Agent (uncredited)
 The Claydon Treasure Mystery (1938) as Holmes (uncredited)
 Meet Mr. Penny (1938) as Mr. Wilson
 I've Got a Horse (1938) as Police Constable
 Keep Smiling (1938) as Assistant Hotel Clerk (uncredited)
 The Outsider (1939) as Patient (uncredited)
 The Lion Has Wings (1939) as Waiter (uncredited)
 Over the Moon (1939) as Dwight - Sanitarium Spokesman (uncredited)
 The Lambeth Walk (1939) as Lord Battersby
 Poison Pen (1939) as Postman
 The Briggs Family (1940) as Man with Moustache at Party (uncredited)
 Turned Out Nice Again (1941) as Removal Man (uncredited)
 Lady from Lisbon (1942) as Ganier
 Asking for Trouble (1942) as Pettifer
 The Demi-Paradise (1943) as Nightclub Waiter (uncredited)
 Night Boat to Dublin (1946) as Taxi Driver
 Wanted for Murder (1946) as Guide in Madame Tussaud's
 Appointment with Crime (1946) as Cleaner
 While the Sun Shines (1947) as Male Receptionist
 Meet Me at Dawn (1947) as Garin - News Editor
 The Ghosts of Berkeley Square (1947) as Staff Captain
 My Brother Jonathan (1948) as Mr. Gaige
 The Winslow Boy (1948) as Wilkinson (uncredited)
 Bond Street (1948) as Jeweller
 My Brother's Keeper (1948) as Harding
 Quartet (1948) as 2nd Clubman (segment "The Colonel's Lady")
 The Passionate Friends (1949) as Lawyer
 The Forbidden Street (1949) as Mr. Culver
 That Dangerous Age (1949) as Mr. Potts
 The Bad Lord Byron (1949) as Mr. Hopton
 Adam and Evelyne (1949) as Col. Bradley
 Helter Skelter (1949) as Dr. B. Jekyll / Mr. Hyde
 Conspirator (1949) as Lord Pennistone
 The Third Man (1949) as Crabbin
 The Man on the Eiffel Tower (1949) as Professor Grollet
 Golden Salamander (1950) as Agno
 The Angel with the Trumpet (1950) as Simmerl
 Last Holiday (1950) as Chalfont
 Trio (1950) as Mr. Gray (segment "Mr. Know-All")
 The Mudlark (1950) as Tucker (uncredited)
 Highly Dangerous (1950) as Mr. Luke - British consul
 Midnight Episode (1950) as Mr. Knight
 Blackmailed (1951) as Lord Dearsley
 Mister Drake's Duck (1951) as Mr. May
 The Browning Version (1951) as Dr. Frobisher
 No Highway in the Sky (1951) as Fisher, Inspector of Accidents (uncredited)
 Outcast of the Islands (1951) as Vinck
 Mr. Denning Drives North (1952) as Woods
 The Card (1952) as Lord at Liverpool Boat Harbour (uncredited)
 Top Secret (1952) as Sir Hubert Wells
 The Story of Gilbert and Sullivan (1953) as Mr. Marston
 Four Sided Triangle (1953) as Government Minister (segment "Priceless Pocket")
 The Million Pound Note (1954) as Roderick Montpelier
 The Rainbow Jacket (1954) as Lord Stoneleigh
 Duel in the Jungle (1954) as Pitt
 Betrayed (1954) as Gen. Charles Larraby
 To Dorothy a Son (1954) as Mr. Starke
 See How They Run (1955) as Brig. Buskin
 John and Julie (1955) as Sir James
 The Adventures of Quentin Durward (1955) as Master Oliver
 The March Hare (1956) as Col. Keene
 My Teenage Daughter (1956) as Sir Joseph
 The Silken Affair (1956) as Sir Horace Hogg
 Tarzan and the Lost Safari (1957) as 'Doodles' Fletcher
 That Woman Opposite (1957) as Sir Maurice Lawes
 The Vicious Circle (1957) as Maj. Harrington, aka Robert Brady
 The Truth About Women (1957) as Sir George Tavistock
 Up the Creek (1958) as Adm. Foley
 Wonderful Things! (1958) as Sir Bertram
 The Lady Is a Square (1959) as Charles
 Carry On Nurse (1959) as The Colonel
 Life in Emergency Ward 10 (1959) as Professor Bourne-Evans
 North West Frontier (1959) as Bridie
 Libel (1959) as Hubert Foxley 
 Two-Way Stretch (1960) as Soapy Stevens
 Let's Make Love (1960) as George Welch
 His and Hers (1961) as Charles Dunton
 On the Double (1961) as Colonel Somerset
 Ada (1961) as Sylvester Marin
 On the Fiddle (1961) as Trowbridge
 Crooks Anonymous (1962) as Laurence Montague
 In Search of the Castaways (1962) as Lord Glenarvan
 Aliki My Love (1963) as Richard Caraway
 My Fair Lady (1964) as Colonel Hugh Pickering
 John Goldfarb, Please Come Home! (1965) as Mustafa Guz
 You Must Be Joking! (1965) as Gen. Lockwood
 Ten Little Indians (1965) as Judge Cannon
 The Liquidator (1965) as Chief
 Our Man in Marrakesh (1966) as Arthur Fairbrother
 The Sandwich Man (1966) as Lord Uffingham
 Chamber of Horrors (1966) as Harold Blount
 The Million Eyes of Sumuru (1967) as Colonel Baisbrook
 P.J. (1968) as Billings-Browne
 The Magic Christian (1969) as Captain Reginald K. Klaus
 Gaily, Gaily (1969) as The Governor
 Skullduggery (1970) as Eaton
 Fragment of Fear (1970) as Mr. Copsey
 The Cherry Picker (1974) as Dobson
 No Longer Alone (1976) as Lord Home
 The Cat and the Canary (1979) as Cyrus West
 King Solomon's Treasure (1979) as Oldest Club Member
 A Touch of the Sun (1979) as M-1
 Xanadu (1980) as Male Heavenly Voice (voice)
 In God We Tru$t (1980) as Abbot Thelonious
 Oh, God! Book II (1980) as Judge Thomas Miller
 Tarzan, the Ape Man (1981) as Club Member (voice)
 The Toy (1982) as Barkley
 Fanny Hill (1983) as Mr. John Barville

Partial television credits
 Laburnum Grove (BBC, 1947) as Bernard Baxley
 A Month in the Country (BBC, 1947) as Bolshintsov
 Affairs of State (BBC, 1952)
 The Reluctant Debutante (BBC, 1955) as Jimmy Broadbent
 The Twilight Zone: "Passage on the Lady Anne" (1963)
 Lucy in London (1966) as Madame Tussauds Guide
 Mission: Impossible: "Echo of Yesterday" (1967)
 Daniel Boone: "Who Will They Hang From The Yardarm If Willy Gets Away" (1968)
 The Sunshine Patriot (TV movie, 1968) as Morris Vanders
 Fear No Evil (TV movie, 1969) as Harry Snowden
 Run a Crooked Mile (TV movie, 1969) as Dr. Ralph Sawyer
 It Takes a Thief: "To Lure a Man" (1969)
 Ritual of Evil (TV movie, 1970) as Harry Snowden
 Columbo: "Dagger of the Mind" (1972)
 A Brand New Life (TV movie, 1973) as Mr. Berger
 Columbo: "Last Salute to the Commodore" (1976)
 The Great Houdini (TV Movie, 1976) as Supt. Melville
 Battlestar Galactica (TV, 1978) as Sire Anton
 Battlestar Galactica (1978)
 The Associates (1979)
 The Rebels (TV movie, 1979) as Gen. Howe
 Vegas (TV episode, 1979) as Prof. Tolan
 Laverne and Shirley (TV episode, 1980) as Colonel Kalaback
 Scout's Honor (TV movie, 1980) as Uncle Toby "Nuncle" Bartlett
 Dick Turpin (1981) as Governor Sir Basil Appleyard
 Buck Rogers in the 25th Century (1981) as Dr. Goodfellow
 Father Damien: The Leper Priest (TV movie, 1980) as Bishop Maigret
 The Letter (TV movie, 1982) as Judge

Theatre 
Hyde-White appeared in numerous plays, such as The Jockey Club Stakes, at first in London's West End in 1970, starring alongside Viviane Ventura, then on Broadway in 1973; he received a Tony award for "Best Actor in a Play" for the Broadway run.

References

External links

 
 
 
 

1903 births
1991 deaths
Alumni of RADA
English expatriates in the United States
English male film actors
English male stage actors
English male television actors
English male radio actors
People from Bourton-on-the-Water
People educated at Marlborough College
Male actors from Gloucestershire
20th-century English male actors
British expatriate male actors in the United States